The 2002 Letran Knights men's basketball team represented Colegio de San Juan de Letran in the 78th season of the National Collegiate Athletic Association in the Philippines. The men's basketball tournament for the school year 2002-03 began on June 29, 2002, and the host school for the season was San Beda College.

This season marked the return of Louie Alas as head coach of the Knights after his stints in Manila Metrostars of the Metropolitan Basketball Association and the Mobiline Phone Pals of the Philippine Basketball Association. Louie Alas debuted with the Knights and won his first NCAA championship, giving Letran its 13th NCAA men's basketball title, back in 1998 before he went in the MBA.

The Knights finished the season at sixth place with 7 wins against 7 losses, missing the Final Four for three consecutive years since winning back-to-back titles in 1998 and 1999.

Roster 

 Depth chart Depth chart

NCAA Season 78 games results 

Elimination games were played in a double round-robin format. All games were aired on Studio 23.

Source: ABS-CBN Pinoy Central

References 

Letran Knights basketball team seasons